Grant is an unincorporated community in Hardin County, in the U.S. state of Ohio.

History
A post office called Grant was established in 1863, and remained in operation until 1913. The community was named for General Ulysses S. Grant, afterward 18th President of the United States.

References

Unincorporated communities in Hardin County, Ohio
1863 establishments in Ohio
Unincorporated communities in Ohio